Princess Charlotte Amalie of Hesse-Wanfried (March 8, 1679, in Wanfried – February 18, 1722, in Paris) was a Princess consort of Transylvania as the wife of Francis II Rákóczi. She was born the daughter of Charles, Landgrave of Hesse-Wanfried, ruler of Hesse-Wanfried and his second wife, Countess Alexandrine Juliane of Leiningen-Dagsburg (1651-1703).

References 

1659 births
1722 deaths
German princesses
Hungarian princesses
Daughters of monarchs